The Traverse City Pit Spitters are a baseball team in the Northwoods League, a collegiate summer baseball league, and began play in the 2019 season. Based out of Traverse City, Michigan, the Pit Spitters play their home games at Turtle Creek Stadium in nearby Blair Township. The team began play at Turtle Creek Stadium in 2019 after the park's former tenant, the Traverse City Beach Bums of the Frontier League, ceased operations at the end of the 2018 season.

Traverse City has a baseball history, beginning with the Traverse City Hustlers, a semi-professional team in the 1890s.  The city had a minor league team, the Traverse City Resorters of the Class D West Michigan League and Michigan State League between 1910 - 1914. Baseball then returned to Traverse City in 2006 with the Traverse City Beach Bums of the independent Frontier League, but on September 26, 2018, it was announced that Wuerfel Park had been purchased by a new investment group led by the owners of the West Michigan Whitecaps (Class A Midwest League affiliate of MLB's Detroit Tigers), with the park's previous team, the Beach Bums, ceasing operations.  The new ownership group announced plans to launch a new franchise in the Northwoods League for the 2019 season.

On October 25, 2018 the team named Josh Rebandt as their first field manager.  A name-the-team contest was held until December 14, with six finalists: Black Pearls, Dogmen, Dune Bears, Pit Spitters, Tree Shakers and Sasquatch.  On January 29, 2019, the Pit Spitters' name and logos were officially announced.

2019 inaugural season 
May 28, 2019, served as the opening day for the Pit Spitters as they defeated the Green Bay Booyah 2–1 before 2,274 fans.  The Pit Spitters advanced to the playoffs with an overall record of 52–20 (.722), winning both halves of the season.  In the playoffs, the Pit Spitters first defeated the Kalamazoo Growlers 2-0 (8-1, 5-4) in a best-of-three series and then the Madison Mallards 3–2 to advance to the Northwoods League championship game.

The championship game was played at Pit Spitters Park in front of 4,636 fans as Traverse City had the better overall record.  The Spitters trailed the Eau Claire Express 2-1 heading to the bottom of the ninth, but two Express errors, including a misplayed bunt off the bat of Traverse City's Andrew Morrow (Michigan State) with two outs allowed catcher Adam Proctor (Michigan State) to score and gave Traverse City a 3–2 victory, giving the Pit Spitters the Northwoods League title in their first season.

The 2019 Spitters were led by 1B Morrow (.263 BA, 6 HR, 58 RBI), Mario Camilletti (Central Michigan) (.297 BA, 29 RBI), OF Jake Wilson (Bowling Green) (.280 BA, 4 HR, 45 RBI), and pitchers Andrew Hoffman (Oakland University) (8–0, 1.08 ERA) and Joe Pace (Michigan) (0–1, 6 saves, 0.50 ERA).  Manager Josh Rebrandt was named Northwoods League Manager of the Year.

2020 pod season 
On June 25, 2020, following decreasing regulations for the COVID-19 pandemic, the Northwoods League approved the creation of two temporary teams to play during the 2020 season: the Northern Michigan Dune Bears and the Great Lakes Resorters. The three teams would be the only ones to play in the Michigan North pod at Turtle Creek Stadium for the season until the playoffs in September. On July 5 of the same year, the season was put on pause due a number of players testing positive for the virus. Play was supposed to resume on July 10, but was pushed further back to July 19. Play resumed that day, but the Dune Bears team had been temporarily dissolved (with the possibility of returning later in the season), leaving the rest of the 2020 season to be played between the Pit Spitters and Resorters.

Traverse City would advance from the Michigan North Pod to the Michigan pod championship game, losing to the Kalamazoo Mac Daddies, another created team for the unique pandemic season, from the Michigan South pod 4-1 at Turtle Creek Stadium. 1B Chris Monroe (Illinois-Springfield) (.348 BA, 2 HR, 28 RBI), Mario Camilletti (Central Michigan) (.348 BA, 17 RBI), and All Northwoods League selections SS Spencer Schwellenbach (Nebraska) (.356 BA, 17 RBI, 12 SB) and pitcher Chad Patrick (Purdue University Northwest) (2-1, 3 IP, 1.03 ERA) led the Pit Spitters during the 2020 season.

2021 season 

The Pit Spitters won their second Northwoods League championship in 2021.  The team finished first in the Great Lakes East division in the first half with a record of 21-15 (.583), edging the Kenosha Kingfish by 1 game, guaranteeing a place in the playoffs.  Traverse City would finish second in the 2nd half, 21-14 (.600), 3.5 games behind the Kokomo Jackrabbits.

Kokomo had home-field advantage for the opening best-of-three series with the better overall record, but Traverse City took the series 2-1 (9-2, 0-3, 9-6), scoring 3 runs in the 9th inning of the deciding game in Kokomo to take the series, with SS Christian Faust (Grand Valley State) singling in DH Michael Styges (Oakland University) to break the deadlock in the top of the 9th inning, and closer John Beuckelaere (Madonna University) securing the lead in the bottom of the inning for the series win.

Traverse City then defeated the Madison Mallards 6-2 at home in a single-game elimination behind a complete-game pitching performance by Joe Horoszko (Wittenberg University), advancing to the Northwoods League championship game.  The Spitters faced the St. Cloud Rox on the road, winning the championship 9-3 with the strong pitching of Northwoods League Pitcher of the Year Cam Schuelke (Florida Gulf Coast University) and a home-run from Mario Camilletti (Central Michigan) making the difference.

The team was led on the season by 2B Camilletti (.312 BA, 34 RBI, 14 SB), OF Tito Flores (Michigan) (.295 BA, 41 RBI, 13 SB),  and Northwoods League all-stars 1B Chris Monroe (Illinois-Springfield) (.303 BA, 7 HR, 59 RBI) and pitcher Schuelke (4-0, 0.68 ERA).

2022 season 

Traverse City struggled out of the gate as the two–time defending league champions, with a 5–game losing streak, followed by a 5-game winning streak and then a 7-game losing streak to finish the first half at 18–18 (.500), 4 games behind the Kalamazoo Growlers.  In a reversed second half, the Pit Spitters posted a stellar 27-9 (.750) record, winning the division in the second half, to advanced the first round of the Northwoods League playoff, facing first-half champions Kalamazoo in a best-of-three series.  The opener in Kalamazoo saw Traverse City lose 5-4, as the Growlers came from behind with a 2-run 7th inning on a home-run by Kalamazoo infielder Anthony Stephan (Virginia).  The timely hitting by the Growlers continued in game two, a 9-5 Kalamazoo victory, with a 4-run 6th, as the Growlers once again got to the Pit Spitters bullpen, and then escaped a no-out, bases loaded jam in the 7th, for the win and a 2-0 series victory.  Kalamazoo would then go on to win the Northwoods League championship, defeating the Duluth Huskies 8-2 in the Northwoods League World Series.

Pitcher Aren Gustafson (Olivet Nazarene) (3–3, 3.72 ERA, 55.2 IP) was named to the NWL post-season All-Star team.  Gustafson and pitcher Derek Clark (Northwood University) (4-0, 2.38 ERA, 41.2 IP) represented Traverse City at the mid-season All-Star game.   The team was led on the season by catcher Colin Summerhill (Northern Illinois) (.311 BA, 4 HR, 51 RBI), outfielder Marshall Toole (Wofford College) (.301 BA, 27 SB), and pitcher Aaron Forrest (Doane University) (4-1, 2.57 ERA, 49 IP).

Pit Spitters taken in MLB draft

Mascot 
The mascot of the Traverse City Pit Spitters is Monty, a "blue furry creature" said to have grown up on a Montmorency cherry orchard near Traverse City.

References

External links

Northwoods League teams
Amateur baseball teams in Michigan
Sports in Traverse City, Michigan
Baseball teams established in 2019
2019 establishments in Michigan